This article details the Wakefield Trinity Wildcats rugby league football club's 2015 season.

Pre season friendlies

Wakefield score is first.

Table

Table to be inputted.

2015 fixtures and results

2015 Super League Fixtures

2015 Super 8 Qualifiers

Million Pound Game
After the Super 8 Qualifiers, Wakefield Trinity Wildcats finished 4th in the table and Championship side Bradford Bulls finished 5th meaning that the two teams would meet in a play-off match to determine who would join Hull Kingston Rovers, Widnes Vikings and Salford Red Devils in next seasons Super League.

Player appearances
Super League Only

 = Injured

 = Suspended

Challenge Cup

Player appearances
Challenge Cup Games only

2015 squad statistics

 Appearances and points include (Super League, Challenge Cup and Play-offs) as of 3 October 2015.

 = Injured
 = Suspended

2015 transfers in/out

In

Out

References

External links
Wakefield Trinity Wildcats Website
Wakefield Trinity Wildcats - SL Website

Wakefield Trinity seasons
Wakefield Trinity Wildcats seasons